Vernon Bailey may refer to:

Vernon Howe Bailey (1874–1953), American artist and photographer
Vernon Orlando Bailey (1864–1942), American naturalist